Spodoptera triturata, the lawn worm, is an Afrotropical moth of the  family Noctuidae found in Sierra Leone, the Democratic Republic of Congo, Kenya, and South Africa.

See also 
 African armyworm (Spodoptera exempta)

References

External links
Spodoptera triturata, African moths

Moths described in 1857
Spodoptera
Moths of Africa